Wang Wencai (5 June 1926 – 16 November 2022) was a Chinese plant taxonomist, and an academician of the Chinese Academy of Sciences. He was a member of the China Democratic League.

Biography
Wang was born in Jinan, Shandong, on 5 June 1926, while his ancestral home is in Ye County (now Laizhou). His father Wang Lanyu was a merchant and his mother Zhao Yanwen was a native of Peiping. He had an elder half brother and two elder half sisters. In 1937, Wang moved to Peiping with his mother, where he attended Beiping No. 4 High School. In 1945, he enrolled at the National Peiping Normal University (now Beijing Normal University), where he majored in the Department of Biology. After graduating in 1949, he stayed and taught at the university.

Wang was assigned as an assistant to the Institute of Botany, Chinese Academy of Sciences in March 1950, becoming assistant research fellow in 1953, associate research fellow in 1978, and research fellow in 1982.

On 16 November 2022, Wang died from an illness in Beijing, at the age of 96.

Contributions
Wang was engaged in the taxonomic research of Ranunculaceae, Urticaceae, Boraginaceae, Cichoriaceae and other families, and had found 20 new genera and about 550 new species; According to the evolutionary trends revealed by him, the taxonomic systems of Delphinium, Thalictrum, Adonis, Clematis, Stephania, Boehmeria, Epinephelus and Cichorium were revised and a taxonomic system was established for the three genera: Sarcandra, Microporus, and Epinephelus.

Honours and awards
 1987 State Natural Science Award (First Class) for the Atlas of Chinese Higher Plants and Key to Chinese Higher Plants
 1993 Member of the Chinese Academy of Sciences (CAS)
 1997 Science and Technology Progress Award of the Ho Leung Ho Lee Foundation

References

1926 births
2022 deaths
People from Jinan
Chinese botanists
Scientists from Jiangsu
Beijing Normal University alumni
Academic staff of Beijing Normal University
Members of the Chinese Academy of Sciences